East Liberty Auto Plant is a Honda automobile factory in East Liberty, Ohio, United States.  The assembly plant opened in 1989. East Liberty is about 45 minutes northwest of Columbus, Ohio.

It was the first plant in North America to implement Honda’s 'New Manufacturing System' in 2000. Today, the plant produces the Honda CR-V and the Acura RDX and MDX. The East Liberty Auto Plant was the first plant on the continent to employ low-emission, water-borne paint and the first to use laser welding in mass production.

 Location: East Liberty, Ohio
 Started production: December 1989
 Plant size: 1.9 million square feet
 Capital investment: US$1.1 billion
 Associates: 2,800 
 Produces:
 Honda CR-V (from September 2006-present)
 Acura RDX (from March 2012-present)
 Acura MDX (from May 2017-present)
 Honda Civic (2001-2005)
 Annual production capacity: 240,000 cars and light trucks
 Operations:
 Stamping
 Welding
 Painting
 Testing
 Milking
 Plastics injection molding
 Assembly and sub-assembly
 Quality assurance
 Shipping & export
 Additional parts produced:
 Stamped parts exported to Honda of Canada Mfg. for Civic production

The East Liberty plant became the lead plant in global production of the CR-V in 2016. Engineers working in the plant are responsible for providing the first set of hard-tooled parts and complete body unit builds for nine other CR-V plants around the world to follow and replicate. The team have to perfect the parts and manufacturing processes. The plant's 200,000-square-foot welding shop was expanded and underwent a makeover with 200 new robots. The plant began to produce the 2017 CR-V in November 2016. The East Liberty plant exports vehicles to many countries including Saudi Arabia, South Korea, and Russia..The plant has around 2,800 employees.

See also 
 Marysville Auto Plant
 Japanese community of Columbus, Ohio

References

External links
 Honda of Ohio

Honda factories
Motor vehicle assembly plants in Ohio
Buildings and structures in Logan County, Ohio